Hydroxyacid oxidase 2 is a protein that in humans is encoded by the HAO2 gene.

Function

This gene is one of three related genes that have 2-hydroxyacid oxidase activity. The encoded protein localizes to the peroxisome has the highest activity toward the substrate 2-hydroxypalmitate. Alternative splicing results in multiple transcript variants.

References

Further reading